{{Automatic taxobox
| taxon = Quilticohyla
| authority = Faivovich et al., 2018
| subdivision_ranks = Species
| subdivision = * Q. acrochorda
 Q. erythromma Q. sanctaecrucis Q. zoque}}Quilticohyla is a genus of frogs in the family Hylidae. They are native to southern Mexico and eastern Guatemala. All species in this genus are endangered or critically endangered.

Members of this genus were formerly classified in the genus Ptychohyla, but the new genus Quilticohyla was coined for them in 2018 after this classification was found to be paraphyletic. The genus name originates from the Nahuatl word quiltic, meaning "green", which refers to the green coloration of these frogs. Quilticohyla is thought to be the sister genus to Bromeliohyla''.

The genus has 4 recognized species:

References 

Quilticohyla
Hylinae
Amphibian genera
Amphibians of Central America
Amphibians of North America
Taxa named by Darrel Frost